This is a list of members of the Tasmanian House of Assembly between the 19 February 1955 election and the 13 October 1956 election.

Sources
 
 Parliament of Tasmania (2006). The Parliament of Tasmania from 1856

Members of Tasmanian parliaments by term
20th-century Australian politicians